Dyberry is a second-class township in Wayne County, Pennsylvania, United States. The township's population was 1,401 at the time of the 2010 United States Census.

Geography

Communities
The following villages are located in Dyberry Township:
Dyberry
Tanners Falls (also called Tanner's Falls)

Demographics

As of the census of 2010, there were 1,401 people, 544 households, and 378 families residing in the township.  The population density was 63.1 people per square mile (24.4/km2).  There were 691 housing units at an average density of 31.1/sq mi (12.2/km2).  The racial makeup of the township was 97.1% White, 0.5% African American, 0.7% Asian, and 1.6% from two or more races. Hispanic or Latino of any race were 1.5% of the population.

There were 544 households, out of which 25.4% had children under the age of 18 living with them, 57.7% were married couples living together, 7.4% had a female householder with no husband present, and 30.5% were non-families. 24.8% of all households were made up of individuals, and 10.9% had someone living alone who was 65 years of age or older.  The average household size was 2.38 and the average family size was 2.82.

In the township the population was spread out, with 18.7% under the age of 18, 65.3% from 18 to 64, and 16% who were 65 years of age or older.  The median age was 46.7 years.

The median income for a household in the township was $47,463, and the median income for a family was $60,556. Males had a median income of $33,056 versus $23,782 for females. The per capita income for the township was $21,428.  About 1% of families and 23.4% of the population were below the poverty line, including 3.3% of those under age 18 and 8.9% of those age 65 or over.

References

Townships in Wayne County, Pennsylvania
Townships in Pennsylvania